Jack Ellis may refer to:

Jack Ellis (rugby league), (1899–1964) New Zealand rugby league player
Jack Ellis (footballer, born 1908) (1908–1994), English footballer
Jack Ellis (rugby union) (1912–2007), English rugby player
Jack Ellis (politician) (1929–1994), Canadian politician
Jack Ellis (Australian footballer) (born 1933), Australian rules footballer
C. Jack Ellis (born 1946), mayor of Macon, Georgia
Jack Ellis (actor) (born 1955), British television actor
Jack Ellis (writer) (born 1978), Australian writer
Jack Ellis (footballer, born 2003), English footballer

See also 
John Ellis (disambiguation)